The Arctic Point Fire Lookout is a  tall fire tower located near Big Creek, Idaho. It was listed on the U.S. National Register of Historic Places (NRHP) in 1994.  Its NRHP listing included two contributing buildings, a log cabin residence and a standard type outhouse, as well as one contributing structure, the fire tower itself.

The tower was built in 1936. It is an Aermotor Company tower topped with a 7x7 foot  (2.1x2.1 m) galvanized steel cab and is the last tower of its type still standing in a wilderness area. The cabin was added as a residence for the lookouts in 1939. It remained in use for its intended purpose until 1997, when it was decommissioned.

References

External links

Arctic Point Fire Lookout photo

Government buildings completed in 1936
Towers completed in 1936
Buildings and structures in Idaho County, Idaho
Fire lookout towers on the National Register of Historic Places in Idaho
National Register of Historic Places in Idaho County, Idaho
1936 establishments in Idaho